CJOT-FM (99.7 MHz) is a commercial FM radio station licensed to Ottawa, Ontario. It broadcasts a classic hits format and is owned by Corus Entertainment. The station uses its on-air brand name Boom 99.7.

CJOT's studios and offices are located on Merivale Road in Nepean along with sister station CKQB-FM. The transmitter is located off Stagecoach Road (Route 25) in Greely, southeast of Ottawa.

History
Astral Media was authorized by the Canadian Radio-television and Telecommunications Commission (CRTC) on August 26, 2008, to build a new FM radio station in Ottawa. It signed on the air on May 27, 2010, with an adult contemporary format branded as 99.7 EZ Rock. The first song on "EZ Rock" was "Haven't Met You Yet" by Michael Bublé.

CJOT became the new flagship station of the "EZ Rock" brand in Canada, about five months after the sign-off of Toronto's 97.3 CJEZ-FM, which became adult hits-formatted CHBM-FM, Boom 97.3. But on June 30, 2011, at 3 p.m., CJOT also flipped to a classic hits format, branded as Boom 99.7. The last song on "EZ Rock" was "Forget You" by Cee-Lo Green, while the first song on "Boom" was "Start Me Up" by Rolling Stones. The station's playlist focuses on songs from the 1970s, 80s and 90s.

In March 2013, as part of Bell Canada's proposed acquisition of Astral Media, Corus Entertainment reached a tentative deal to acquire Astral's 50% stake in the Teletoon networks, along with several radio stations (including CJOT), for $400.6 million.

On January 28, 2014, the CRTC approved Corus's acquisition of CJOT and sister station CKQB-FM. The acquisition was closed on January 31, 2014.

An unprotected low-power tourist information radio station owned by Instant Information Services operated at 99.7 FM as CIIO-FM. That station was authorised by the CRTC in May 2010 to move to 97.5 MHz. As well, CKQB-FM operated a repeater at 99.7 FM in Pembroke, which later moved to 99.9 FM.

Controversy
On November 21, 2008, federal Minister of Canadian Heritage and Official Languages James Moore issued a statement calling on the CRTC to review its approval of both the Astral station and Frank Torres' new CIDG-FM. Moore asked the commission to assess whether the francophone population of the Ottawa-Gatineau area was sufficiently well-served by existing French radio services, and to consider licensing one or more of the French language applications—which included a Christian music station, a community radio station and a campus radio station for the Université du Québec en Outaouais—in addition to or instead of the approved stations.

In the resulting round of hearings, Torres proposed that a new francophone station could be licensed on 94.5 FM, although such a station would be second-adjacent to Astral's CIMF-FM. Industry Canada subsequently aired a testing signal on 94.5 in May 2009 to determine whether the signal could be used without impacting CIMF. The test found that the signal could be used without causing significant interference to CIMF, and Astral consequently gave its consent to the use of the frequency as long as the company retained authorization to launch the 99.7 station.

References

External links
Boom 99.7
 

Jot
Jot
Jot
Radio stations established in 2008
2008 establishments in Ontario